Son Mi-Na (Korean:손미나; born October 8, 1964) is a South Korean team handball player and Olympic champion.

She participated at the 1984 Summer Olympics in Los Angeles where she received a silver medal with the South Korean team. At the 1988 Summer Olympics in Seoul she won a gold medal.

Shon also took the Athlete's oath with basketball player Hur Jae during the opening ceremonies of the 1988 Games in Seoul.

References

External links

1964 births
Living people
South Korean female handball players
Olympic handball players of South Korea
Handball players at the 1984 Summer Olympics
Handball players at the 1988 Summer Olympics
Olympic gold medalists for South Korea
Olympic medalists in handball
Medalists at the 1984 Summer Olympics
Medalists at the 1988 Summer Olympics
Olympic silver medalists for South Korea
Oath takers at the Olympic Games
20th-century South Korean women